Mohammad Salameh Obaidat is a Jordanian American Academic/ Computer Engineer/computer Scientist and Founding Dean of College of Computing and Informatics at the University of Sharjah, UAE. He is the Past President & Chair of Board of Directors of and a Fellow of the Society for Modeling and Simulation International (SCS), and a Fellow of the Institute of Electrical and Electronics Engineers (IEEE).
He was born in Jordan to The Obaidat known Family. He is the cousin of the Former Prime Minister of Jordan, Ahmed Obaidat (also spelled Obeidat) and received his M.S. and Ph.D. in computer engineering from the Ohio State University, Columbus, Ohio, USA.
He is known for his contributions in the fields of cybersecurity, Biometrics-based Cybersecurity, wireless networks, modeling and simulation, AI/Data Analytics. He served as President and Char of Board of Directors of the Society for Modeling and Simulation International, SCS, a Tenured Professor & Chair of Department of Computer Science at Monmouth University, Tenured Professor & Chair of Department of computer and Information Sciences at Fordham University, USA, Dean of College of Engineering at Prince Sultan University,  and Advisor to the President of Philadelphia University for Research, Development and IT. He has chaired numerous international conferences and has given numerous keynote speeches.

Biography

Obaidat was born in Kufr Soum, Irbid, Jordan to The Obaidat known Family. He is the cousin of the Former Prime Minister of Jordan, Ahmed Obaidat (also spelled Obeidat). He obtained his MS and PH. D. Degrees from The Ohio State University, Columbus, Ohio, USA, where he was on a scholarship. After graduation He worked briefly at Jordan University of Science and Technology, JUST, and then moved to the USA and worked at several Universities, as an assistant professor, associate professor and full professor as well as an academic leader, including City University of New York, Monmouth University and Fordham University.

During the 2014/2015 academic year, he was awarded the Fulbright Distinguished Award and served in Jordan as Advisor to the President of Philadelphia University for Research, Development and IT- The later, Dr. Adnan Badran, became the Prime Minister of Jordan in 2005.

He has received extensive research funding and published To Date (2020) about One Thousand (1,000) refereed technical articles-About half of them are journal articles, over  95 books, and 55 Book Chapters. He is the Editor-in-Chief of the Wiley International Journal of Communication Systems, the Founding Editor-in Chief of Wiley Security and Privacy Journal and an editor of other international journals.  Moreover, he is founder or co-founder of 5 International Conferences: SPECTS, CITS, CCCI, DCNET, SIMULTECH.

Among his previous positions are Advisor to the Former President of President of Philadelphia University (HE Dr. Dr. Adnan Badran) for Research, Development and Information Technology (who became the Prime Minister of Jordan in 2005), President and Chair of Board of Directors of the Society for Molding and Simulation International, SCS, Senior Vice President of SCS, Dean of the College of Engineering at Prince Sultan University, Chair and tenured Professor at the Department of Computer and Information Science and Director of the MS Graduate Program in Data Analytics at Fordham university, Chair and tenured Professor of the Department of Computer Science and Director of the Graduate Program at Monmouth University, Tenured Full Professor at King Abdullah II School of Information Technology, University of Jordan, The PR of China Ministry of Education Distinguished Overseas Professor at the University of Science and Technology Beijing, China and an Honorary Distinguished Professor at the Amity University- A Global University. He is now the Founding Dean of the College of Computing and Informatics at The University of Sharjah, UAE.

He held visiting professorships at various universities, including Aberdeen University, UK, INSA-Rouen, France, Philadelphia University, Jordan, University of Seville, Spain, University of Oviedo, Spain, National Ilan University, Taiwan, Tamkang University, Taiwan, Korea Advanced Institute of Science and Technology (KAIST), South Korea, University of Girona, Spain, Genoa University, Italy, KFUPM, Saudi Arabia, Carthage University, Tunisia, EMI, Morocco, Torino Polytechnic, Italy, Bogazci University, Turkey, and International Islamic University Malaysia, Prince Sultan University, Saudi Arabia, Beihang University, China, Nanjing University of Posts & Telecommunications, China, Beijing University of Posts and Telecommunications (BUPT), China, University of Science and Technology Beijing, China, Fudan University, China, University of Calabria, Italy, Khalifa University, UAE, Huazhong University of Science and Technology, China, University of Haute Alsace, France, Indian Institute of Technology-Dhanbad, RV College of Engineering and Technology, India, Sri Padmavati Mahila University Tirupati, India, Habin Institute of Technology, China, Jaypee University of Information Technology, Haldia Institute of Technology, India.

He has chaired numerous international conferences and has given numerous keynote speeches worldwide. He has served as ABET/CSAB evaluator and on IEEE CS Fellow Evaluation Committee. He has served as IEEE CS Distinguished Speaker/Lecturer and an ACM Distinguished Lecturer. Since 2004 has been serving as an SCS Distinguished Lecturer. He received many best paper awards for his papers including ones from IEEE ICC 2018, IEEE Globecom 2009, AICSA 2009, CITS 2015, CITS 2019, SPECTS 2018, DCNET 2011 International conferences. He also received Best Paper awards from IEEE Systems Journal in 2018 and in 2019 (2 Best Paper Awards). In 2020, he received 4 best paper awards from IEEE Systems Journal.

He also received many other worldwide awards for his technical contributions including: The 2018 IEEE ComSoc-Technical Committee on Communications Software 2018 Technical Achievement Award for contribution to Cybersecurity, Wireless Networks Computer Networks and Modeling and Simulation, SCS prestigious McLeod Founder's Award , Presidential Service Award, SCS Hall of Fame –Lifetime Achievement Award for his technical contribution to modeling and simulation and for his outstanding visionary leadership and dedication to increasing the effectiveness and broadening the applications of modeling and simulation worldwide. He also received the SCS Outstanding Service Award. He was awarded the IEEE CITS Hall of Fame Distinguished and Eminent Award.

He is a Life Fellow of IEEE and a Fellow of SCS.

Editorship of Journals 
Since 1997, Obaidat has been the editor–in-chief of the International Journal of Communication Systems, published by John Wiley & Sons.  He is also the Founding Editor-in Chief of Wiley Security and Privacy Journal since 2018, and an editor of other international journals. Obaidat is the editor of the Journal of Convergence published by FTRA and Journal of Information Processing Systems, KIPS. He is currently Editor, Advisory editor, or editorial board member of numerous other scholarly journals and transactions including IEEE Systems Journal,  IEEE Wireless Communications, Simulation: SCS Transactions of the Society for Modeling & Simulation International,  Elsevier Computer Communications Journal, Springer, Journal of Supercomputing, among others. He also served as Editor of IEEE Transactions on SMC-Parts A, B and C. Prof. Obaidat has chaired a number of international conferences and served as an advisor to many international conferences and organizations. He has given numerous keynote speeches and invited talks worldwide.

Awards
Obaidat has received many awards, including the many best paper awards such as the ones from IEEE ICC 2018, IEEE Globecom 2009, AICSA 2009, CITS 2015, CITS 2019, SPECTS 2018, DCNET 2011 International conferences. He also received Best Paper awards from IEEE Systems Journal in 2018 and in 2019 (2 Best Paper Awards). In 2020, he received 4 best paper awards from IEEE Systems Journal.

He also received many other worldwide awards for his technical contributions including: The 2018 IEEE ComSoc-Technical Committee on Communications Software 2018 Technical Achievement Award for contribution to Cybersecurity, Wireless Networks Computer Networks and Modeling and Simulation, SCS prestigious McLeod Founder's Award , Presidential Service Award, SCS Hall of Fame –Lifetime Achievement Award for his technical contribution to modeling and simulation and for his outstanding visionary leadership and dedication to increasing the effectiveness and broadening the applications of modeling and simulation worldwide. He also received the SCS Outstanding Service Award the Nokia Research Fellowship Award, and the Fulbright Distinguished Scholar Award He was awarded the IEEE CITS Hall of Fame Distinguished and Eminent Award and IEEE Life Fellow Award

References
1.     ^ "Archived copy". Archived from the original on 2012-03-13. Retrieved 2010-10-04.

2.     ^ "Fellow & Distinguished Lectureship".

3.     ^ "International Journal of communication Systems". International Journal of Communication Systems. 2008. CiteSeerX 10.1.1.606.6233. doi:10.1002/(ISSN)1099-1131.

4.     ^ The Society for Modeling & Simulation International. "Awards | The Society for Modeling & Simulation International". Scs.org. Retrieved 2010-10-02.

5.     ^ "Archived copy". Archived from the original on 2011-02-22. Retrieved 2010-10-04.

6.     ^ "IEEE Fellows Directory - Alphabetical Listing". services27.ieee.org. Retrieved January 25, 2019

7.     IEEE Systems Journal Best Paper Awards: https://ieeesystemscouncil.org/awards/systems-journal-best-paper-award?page=1

8.     University of Sharjah

9.     Founding Dean of College of Computing and Informatics

10.  Fulbright Distinguished Award

11.  2018 IEEE ComSoc-Technical Committee on Communications Software 2018 Technical Achievement Award

12.  IEEE ICC 2018

13.  IEEE Globecom 2009

14.  Wiley Security and Privacy Journal

https://en.wikipedia.org/wiki/List_of_Arab_Americans

American computer scientists
21st-century American engineers
Fellow Members of the IEEE
Living people
Ohio State University alumni
Academic staff of the International Islamic University Malaysia
Fordham University faculty
American people of Jordanian descent
Academic staff of the University of Oviedo
Year of birth missing (living people)